Achalpur, formerly known as Ellichpur and Illychpur, is a city and a municipal council in Amravati District in the Indian state of Maharashtra. It is the second most populous city in Amravati District after Amravati and seventh most populous city in Vidarbha. Achalpur camp is known as Paratwada.

History
Achalpur was the earliest capital of a branch of the Rashtrakuta dynasty, which emerged sometime in the 8th century. It was the site of a battle between the Rashtrakutas and the Kalachuris in the 9th century.

Achalpur or Ellichpur is first mentioned authentically in the 13th century as one of the famous cities of the Deccan. Though tributary to the Delhi Sultanate after 1294, it remained under Hindu administration till 1318, when it came directly under the Muslim Delhi Sultanate.

In 1347 Achalpur with the Berar region was ruled by the Bahmani Sultanate.

In 1490 Fathullah Imad-ul-Mulk proclaimed his independence and founded the Imad Shahi dynasty of the Berar Sultanate. He proceeded to annex Mahur to his new kingdom and established his capital at Ellichpur. It was afterwards capital of the Berar Subah at intervals until the Mughal occupation, when the seat of the provincial governor was moved to Balapur. The town retains many relics of the Sultans of Berar.

As the Mughal empire deteriorated in the 18th century, Achalpur along with the rest of Berar came under the rule of the Nizam of Hyderabad. In 1853, Berar Province came under British administration, although it remained formally part of the Hyderabad state until 1903 when the province became the Berar Division of the Central Provinces. Achalpur, known by the British as Ellichpur, became part of East Berar, with Amraoti (Amravati) as capital of the division. In 1867 East Berar was split into the districts of Amraoti and Ellichpur district, with Ellichpur as the headquarters of Ellichpur District.

In 1901 Achalpur had a population of 29,740, with ginning factories and a considerable trade in cotton and forest produce. It was connected by good roads with Amraoti and Chikhaldara.  Berar was annexed to British India in 1903 and merged with the Central Provinces, and in 1905 Ellichpur District was merged into Amraoti District. The civil station of Paratwada, 5 km. from the town of Ellichpur, contained the principal public buildings at the beginning of the 20th century.

After India's independence in 1947, the Central Provinces became the province, and after 1950 the state, Madhya Pradesh. The 1956 States Reorganisation Act redrew the boundaries of India's states along linguistic lines, and the predominantly Marathi-speaking Amravati District was transferred to Bombay State, which was renamed Maharashtra in 1960.

Geography
Achalpur and Paratwada are twin cities located in the lap of Satpuda . It has an average elevation of 369 metres (1210 ft). These twin cities are surrounded by rivers named Sapan and Bicchhan, the tributaries of Chandrabhaga river. There is hilly area that acts like a fence to this city. This city is at the boundary of Maharashtra and Madhya Pradesh. Even Madhya Pradesh is so close to this city that travelling of (about) 12 km changes the state region.

Demographics
As of census 2011 Achalpur Tehsil had a population of 1,12,311.
As of 2001 India census, Achalpur & Paratwada had a population of 107,304. Males constitute 52% of the population and females 48%. Achalpur has an average literacy rate of 88%, higher than the national average of 59.59%; with 54.41% of the males and 46% of females literate. 12% of the population is under 6 years of age.

Transportation
Achalpur railway station is the northern terminus of the 762 mm narrow gauge railway known locally as the Shakuntala railway. This line is composed of two legs intersecting with the Mumbai–Kolkata standard gauge railway at Murtajapur — the 76 km northern leg to Achalpur and the 113 km southeastern leg to Yavatmal. As of 2004 this line was still owned by a London-based company which had leased the line to India's Central Railway since 1903.

Paratwada is well connected to major cities by state highways. Maharashtra Major State Highway 6 and Major State Highway 24 passes from Paratwada. Both public and private transport are popular in Paratwada. Private companies too run buses to major cities throughout India. Auto rickshaws and cycle rickshaws are allowed to operate in this city. Also The Maharashtra State Road Transport Corporation (MSRTC) provides transport services to this city for interstate travel.

See also
Ellichpur District
Paratwada

References

Cities and towns in Amravati district
Talukas in Maharashtra
Cities in Maharashtra